Leidy can refer to:

 Leidy (name), a surname and given name 
 Leidy Glacier, NW Greenland
 Leidy Township, Pennsylvania
 Mount Leidy, a mountain in Wyoming